Cressey is a surname. Notable people with the surname include:

Donald Cressey (1919–1987),  American penologist, sociologist, and criminologist
George Cressey, American geographer, author, and academic
Roger W. Cressey, former member of the United States National Security Council staff